The Cayuse language (Cailloux, Willetpoos) is an extinct unclassified language formerly spoken by the Cayuse Native American tribe in the U.S. state of Oregon.  The Cayuse name for themselves was Liksiyu (see Aoki 1998).

Classification
Similarities to Molala, the language of people to the south of them in central Oregon, are thought to have been due to contact (Rigsby 1969: 71).

Edward Sapir had originally grouped Cayuse with Molala as part of a Waiilatpuan branch with the Plateau Penutian languages; the Waiilatpuan group had been originally proposed by Horatio Hale (1846), based on his 1841 field work with the Cayuse people at Waiilatpu Mission. However, Cayuse has little documentation, and that which is documented is inadequately recorded.

Pronouns
Cayuse pronouns listed by Horatio Hale (1846):
{| class="wikitable"
| I || iniŋ
|-
| you (sg.) || nikí
|-
| you (du.) || nkímiš
|-
| he || nip
|-
| we || námək
|-
| you (pl.) || mkímiš
|-
| they || nípik
|}

Cayuse pronouns listed by McBean:
{| class="wikitable"
| I || in ning
|-
| you (sg., pl.) || in kai
|-
| he || neepe
|-
| we || nung naw naw
|-
| they || cap pick
|}

Verbs
Cayuse verb paradigms documented by Henry W. Henshaw:

'hungry'
{| class="wikitable"
| I am hungry. || wi-tu-tŭnt
|-
| I was hungry. || kler-ka-wĭ-tu-tŭnt
|-
| I will be hungry. || wí-tu-näk-sŭnt
|-
| You and I are hungry. || swi-tu-ter-yìk
|-
| You and I were hungry. || swi-tu-te-lì-kai-ĭk
|-
| You and I will be hungry. || nĭng-i-li-pʔl-swi-tu-nak-stunk-a-wak
|-
| You are hungry. || tu-swi-tu-tuñg-a
|-
| You were hungry. || swi-tu-til-kutla
|-
| You will be hungry. || swi-tu-nak-stung-at-la
|}

'thirsty'
{| class="wikitable"
| I am thirsty. || nĭs-ka-mu-tiñg
|-
| I was thirsty. || nĭs-ka-mu-til
|-
| I will be thirsty. || nĭs-ka-mu-näk-skĭn
|-
| You are thirsty. || tu-mĭs-ka-mu-tĭñg
|-
| You were thirsty. || mĭs-ka-mu-til-hă
|-
| You will be thirsty. || mĭs-ka-mu-na-stĭnk-la
|}

Vocabulary
In 1910 or 1911, Stephens Savage, a Molala speaker, had told Leo Frachtenberg that the following five words were identical in both Cayuse and Molala (considered by Rigsby (1969) to be loanwords).

{| class="wikitable"
| sorrel horse || qasqasi tasiwitkwi
|-
| spotted horse || yuꞏk tasiwitkwi
|-
| black horse || múkimuki tasiwitkwi
|-
| comb || taꞏsps
|-
| spoon || ƚúꞏpinc
|}

Limited lexical items in Cayuse had also been collected by Bruce Rigsby, Melville Jacobs, Verne Ray, and Theodore Stern. Their Cayuse informants had highly limited knowledge of Cayuse and were more fluent in Sahaptin or Nez Perce.

Hale (1846)
A word list of Cayuse with nearby 200 lexical items was documented by Horatio Hale (1846: 570-629). The word list has been reproduced below.

Nouns
{| class="wikitable sortable"
! gloss !! Cayuse
|-
| man || yúant
|-
| woman || pintχlkaíu; watχlóa
|-
| boy || láutlaŋ
|-
| girl || staítχləŋ; staítlaŋ
|-
| infant; child || skútχla
|-
| father || pintét; títʃa
|-
| mother || penín; nínʃa
|-
| husband || ináiu
|-
| wife || inχlkaío
|-
| son || wái
|-
| daughter || wái
|-
| brother || pnákən; pənátaŋ
|-
| sister || pənátiaŋ; pənwaíəq
|-
| Indian; people || -
|-
| head || talʃ; táəlʃ
|-
| hair || tχlókomot
|-
| face || léequkʃ
|-
| forehead || penátχliʃ
|-
| ear || takʃ
|-
| eye || hăkaməʃ
|-
| nose || pitχlóken
|-
| mouth || səmqakʃ
|-
| tongue || puʃ
|-
| teeth || tenif
|-
| beard || ʃimkéməʃ
|-
| neck || yet
|-
| arm || tiélaq
|-
| hand || épip
|-
| fingers || épip
|-
| nails || ʃíŋiʃ
|-
| body || ʃilăməʃ
|-
| leg || maúwət
|-
| foot || tiʃ
|-
| toes || tiyəyáu
|-
| bone || pápət
|-
| heart || -
|-
| blood || tiwéə̈ʃ
|-
| town; village || -
|-
| chief || iatóiaŋ
|-
| warrior || lotéwa
|-
| friend || enlápoit
|-
| house || niʃt
|-
| kettle || tχlípaniʃ
|-
| bow || hífoit
|-
| arrow || lalχ
|-
| axe; hatchet || yeŋgókinʃ
|-
| knife || ʃekt
|-
| canoe; boat || tχláap
|-
| shoes || täítχlo
|-
| pipe || iptnχlónʃ
|-
| tobacco || hanʃ
|-
| sky; heaven || ndjălawaía, tíŋpap
|-
| sun || huéwiʃ
|-
| moon || hátχltóp
|-
| star || tχlítχliʃ
|-
| day || ewéiə̈
|-
| night || ftalp
|-
| light || notawásim
|-
| darkness || ʃilímtiŋk
|-
| morning || tétχlpəna
|-
| evening || wəχaía
|-
| spring || ʃuatoluŋátntiŋ; kiátim
|-
| summer || ʃqáätim
|-
| autumn || təŋ
|-
| winter || wit
|-
| wind || húntilχp
|-
| thunder || tiŋtululutéʃin
|-
| lightning || ʃniktawíŋtiŋ
|-
| rain || tiʃtkitχlmítiŋ
|-
| snow || pói
|-
| hail || puŋiós
|-
| fire || tetʃ
|-
| water || iʃkáiniʃ
|-
| ice || tók
|-
| earth; land || liŋʃ
|-
| sea || yamué-iʃkaíniʃ
|-
| river || luʃmi
|-
| lake || fuŋʃ
|-
| valley || paniákp
|-
| hill; mountain || téit
|-
| island || liŋtkaíli
|-
| stone || ápit
|-
| salt || kamtiʃímpen
|-
| iron || qauqauítχliínik
|-
| tree || laúik
|-
| wood || hútiʃ
|-
| leaf || qaisós
|-
| bark || pétimi
|-
| grass || tχleft; qə́ïʃt
|-
| pine || laúikʃ
|-
| flesh; meat || pítχli
|-
| dog || náapaŋ
|-
| buffalo || -
|-
| bear || liméakʃ; nokoláo
|-
| wolf || tχlaíu; tsóilaχs
|-
| deer || aitχléwa
|-
| elk || yútiŋʃ
|-
| beaver || pīeká
|-
| tortoise || atsík
|-
| fly || tqaínʃiʃ; katχlísaŋ
|-
| mosquito || píŋkii
|-
| snake || waíimaʃ
|-
| bird || tianíyiwa
|-
| egg || lópitχl
|-
| feathers || tiaqaímutχl
|-
| wings || haŋ
|-
| duck || əʃimtχl
|-
| pigeon || súuku
|-
| fish || wiaíiʃ
|-
| salmon || milóqli
|-
| sturgeon || -
|-
| name || peʃp
|-
| affection || atíŋp; tiʃktaʃewetáuŋko
|}

Adjectives
{| class="wikitable sortable"
! gloss !! Cayuse
|-
| white || tχlaktχláko
|-
| black || ʃkupʃkúpu
|-
| red || lakaítlakaítu
|-
| blue || yotsyóts
|-
| yellow || qəʃqə́ʃu
|-
| green || yotsyóts
|-
| great || yaúmua; yiyímu (pl.)
|-
| small || etsáŋua
|-
| strong || ntáloa; naantáloa
|-
| old || kuiátsu
|-
| young || itsáŋu
|-
| good || suaíu; sasuáiu (pl.)
|-
| bad || luastu; laluástu (pl.)
|-
| handsome || hapútsu; suaíu
|-
| ugly || huástu
|-
| alive || wióko
|-
| dead || úwaa
|-
| cold || ʃúŋa
|-
| warm || lokóia
|}

Pronouns
{| class="wikitable sortable"
! gloss !! Cayuse
|-
| I || íniŋ
|-
| thou || nikí
|-
| he || nip
|-
| we || námək
|-
| ye || mkímiʃ; nkímiʃ (dual)
|-
| they || nípik
|-
| this || qe, qă, ke
|-
| that || qá, ká
|-
| all || naŋináo
|-
| many (much) || yíphea
|-
| who || iʃ
|}

Adverbs and others
{| class="wikitable sortable"
! gloss !! Cayuse
|-
| near || piáfi
|-
| today || páməŋ
|-
| yesterday || iétin
|-
| tomorrow || tetχlp
|-
| yes || i
|-
| no || téehu
|}

Numerals
{| class="wikitable sortable"
! gloss !! Cayuse
|-
| one || na
|-
| two || lépli
|-
| three || mátnin
|-
| four || pípiŋ
|-
| five || táwit
|-
| six || nōiná
|-
| seven || nóilip
|-
| eight || nōimát
|-
| nine || tanáuiaiʃímʃim
|-
| ten || niŋítelp
|-
| eleven || nántetχle
|-
| twelve || leplin-ntétχle
|-
| twenty || lépuik
|-
| thirty || mátuík
|-
| one hundred || niŋítalpuík
|-
| one thousand || -
|}

Verbs
{| class="wikitable sortable"
! gloss !! Cayuse
|-
| to eat || pitáŋa
|-
| to drink || pasqunstáŋa
|-
| to run || pqíntuql
|-
| to dance || iókseak
|-
| to sing || tuŋséaql
|-
| to sleep || ʃpíʃiŋql
|-
| to speak || úlipkin
|-
| to see || miskaléntənt
|-
| to love || ktáʃo
|-
| to kill || piaíitχltiŋ
|-
| to sit || ifníql; ifníkta
|-
| to stand || laútsiŋ
|-
| to go || wintúkstaŋa; wintúql (imp.)
|-
| to come || wintúkum
|}

References

 Aoki, Haruo. (1998).  A Cayuse Dictionary based on the 1829 records of Samuel Black, the 1888 records of Henry W. Henshaw and others, Manuscript.  The Confederated Tribes of the Umatilla Indian Reservation.
 Rigsby, Bruce. (1965).  Linguistic Relations in the Southern Plateau, PhD dissertation, University of Oregon.

External links 

Cayuse Indian Language (Waiilatpu)
OLAC resources in and about the Cayuse language

Unclassified languages of North America
Indigenous languages of the North American Plateau
Indigenous languages of Oregon
Extinct languages
Languages extinct in the 1930s
1930s disestablishments in Oregon
Cayuse